Pellucidar: A Dreamers Fantabula is an album by John Zorn's group, The Dreamers, released in June 2015 on the Tzadik label.

Reception

Allmusic said  "It's similar to both The Dreamers and O'o, but the playing of this group never gets old. ...Pellucidar is another great offering from Zorn's most accessible project." PopMatters stated "The peculiar thing about Dreamers is that despite the stunning musical acumen of all involved, they aren’t really what one would call a "musician’s band." Their performances are impressive, but in a subtle way. There are no flights of fancy, just an atmosphere to drape over your senses. When a cozy blanket is covering you, you don’t think about the individual fibers. And when you listen to a Dreamers album, you don’t think about Trevor Dunn’s time in Mr. Bungle. You think about how sweet life is and how having another Dreamers album is now a part of that sweet life."

Track listing
All compositions by John Zorn
 "Magic Carpet Ride" – 7:36
 "Gormenghast" – 8:29
 "Queen of Ilium" – 5:19
 "Once Upon a Time" – 5:13
 "Flight from Salem" – 4:20
 "Pellucidar" – 3:35
 "Atlantis" – 4:59
 "A Perfume from Cleopolis" – 6:09
 "Jewels of Opar" – 6:10

Personnel
Marc Ribot − guitars
Jamie Saft − keyboards
Kenny Wollesen − vibes
Trevor Dunn − bass
Joey Baron − drums
Cyro Baptista − percussion

References

The Dreamers albums
Albums produced by John Zorn
2015 albums
Tzadik Records albums